Allison Cara Tolman is an American actress. She is best known for her role as Molly Solverson in the first season of the FX television series Fargo, earning Emmy and Golden Globe nominations.

Early life and education
Tolman has two older brothers and a younger sister. Her family moved to England when she was a few months old and stayed until she was four years old. She spent the next five years in Oklahoma and West Texas, before moving to Sugar Land, Texas. She started taking acting classes when she was 10 years old at the Fort Bend Community Theatre. She attended Clements High School, graduating in 2000.

She graduated from Baylor University with a Bachelor of Fine Arts in theatrical performance. After college, she moved to Dallas, where she was one of the founding members of Second Thought Theatre.

In 2009, she moved to Chicago, Illinois, to study performance at The Second City Training Center.

Career
In 2014, Tolman starred in the first season of the FX black comedy crime series Fargo. Inspired by the classic 1996 Coen brothers film of the same name, Fargo starred veteran actors Billy Bob Thornton, Martin Freeman and Bob Odenkirk. Tolman received accolades for her performance as Minnesota police officer Molly Solverson, with Vanity Fair writing that she "calmly and assuredly stole the entire show". For her role, she won the Critics' Choice Television Award for Best Supporting Actress in a Movie/Miniseries and received Best Actress nominations at the Emmy Awards and for the Golden Globes.

The same year, it was also announced Tolman would have a two-episode guest role on The Mindy Project as Abby Berman, a romance novelist. In 2015, she had a supporting role in Michael Dougherty's comedy horror film Krampus, in which she co-starred with Adam Scott, David Koechner, Emjay Anthony, and Stefania Owen.

Following her breakout role on Fargo, Tolman declined several supporting parts as mothers, wives and best friends, looking for a more unusual role. In 2017, Tolman starred in ABC's Downward Dog, based on the Animal Media Group web series,  It was canceled after one season.

She starred in the ABC drama series Emergence, which premiered on September 24, 2019, and was cancelled after one season on May 21, 2020, despite getting "pretty solid" ratings according to Tolman on Twitter. She also guest starred in NBC's Good Girls.

In 2021, she starred as Alma Filcott in the second season of the drama series Why Women Kill, and played Natalie Green in The Facts of Life portion of the third edition of Live in Front of a Studio Audience.

Filmography

Film

Television

References

External links

 
 
 

Living people
21st-century American actresses
American television actresses
Baylor University alumni
Actresses from Houston
American film actresses
Actresses from Dallas
Actresses from Chicago
Year of birth missing (living people)